This is a list of Latin American countries and dependent territories by population, which is sorted by the 2015 mid-year normalized demographic projections.

Table

Notes

population
Countries by population
Lists of countries by large sub or trans-continental region, by population